Croatia competed at the Olympic Games for the first time as an independent nation in 1992, and has participated in every Games since then.

The National Olympic Committee for Croatia is the Croatian Olympic Committee, which was created in 1991 and recognized in 1993.

Croatian athletes have won forty-one medals at the Summer Olympic Games, including multiple gold medals by the men's handball team in 1996 and 2004, as well as discus-thrower Sandra Perković in 2012 and 2016. At the Winter Olympic Games, Janica Kostelić won six medals (four gold) between 2002 and 2006, her brother Ivica won four silver medals (in 2006, 2010 and 2014), and Jakov Fak won a bronze in 2010.

Medals

Medals by Summer Games

Medals by Winter Games

Medals by summer sport

Medals by winter sport

List of medalists

Summer sports

Winter sports

Multiple medal winners
This following list only contains Olympic medal winners for Croatia as an independent country.

See also
 List of flag bearers for Croatia at the Olympics
 :Category:Olympic competitors for Croatia
 Croatia at the Paralympics
 Milan Neralić
 List of Yugoslav Olympic medalists

External links
 
 
 
 Sportnet Bernard Jurišić: Tuđe nećemo - svoje ne damo (medals of Yugoslavia  won by Croatian sportsmen), April 1, 2008, accessed September 30, 2010